{{Automatic taxobox
| image = Cheilanthes parryi 1.jpg
| image_caption = Cheilanthes parryi
| taxon = Cheilanthes
| authority = Sw.
| type_species = Cheilanthes micropteris 
| type_species_authority = Sw.
| subdivision = See text
| synonyms = 
 Chrysochosma (J.Sm.) Kümmerle
 Cincinalis Gled. ex Desv.
 Leptolepidium K.H.Hsing & S.K.Wu
 Neurosoria Mett. ex Kuhn
 Oeosporangium Vis.
 Pomatophytum M.E.Jones
}}Cheilanthes, commonly known as lip ferns', is a genus of about 180 species of rock-dwelling ferns with a cosmopolitan distribution in warm, dry, rocky regions, often growing in small crevices high up on cliffs.  Most are small, sturdy and evergreen.   The leaves, often densely covered in trichomes, spring directly from the rootstocks.  Many of them are desert ferns, curling up during dry times and reviving with the coming of moisture.  At the ends of veins sporangia, or spore-bearing structures, are protected by leaf margins, which curl over them.

Taxonomy
The genus name is derived from the Greek words χεῖλος (cheilos), meaning "lip," and ἄνθος (anthos), meaning "flower."Cheilanthes as traditionally circumscribed is now known to be highly paraphyletic, comprising at least four generically separate groups. The type species, C. micropteris, is most closely allied to the genera Aleuritopteris and Sinopteris (Schuettpelz et al.). In the early 21st century, many species, principally from the New World, were moved into the new genus Gaga and the revived genus Myriopteris. Further work remains to be done to render Cheilanthes monophyletic. Members of many other cheilanthoid genera have at times been given names in the genus.

Species
The circumscription of the genus was uncertain . The Checklist of Ferns and Lycophytes of the World lists species in several distinct groups.Cheilanthes sensu stricto contains about 20 species from North and tropical Central and South America:Cheilanthes arequipensis (Maxon) R.M.Tryon & A.F.TryonCheilanthes fractifera TryonCheilanthes glutinosa M.Kessler & A.R.Sm.Cheilanthes incarum MaxonCheilanthes incisa Kunze ex Mett.Cheilanthes juergensii Rosenst.Cheilanthes laciniata SodiroCheilanthes leonardii MaxonCheilanthes leucopoda LinkCheilanthes lonchophylla (R.M.Tryon) R.M.Tryon & A.F.TryonCheilanthes macleanii (J.Sm.) Hook.Cheilanthes mathewsii KunzeCheilanthes micropteris Sw.Cheilanthes pantanalensis E.L.M.Assis, Ponce & LabiakCheilanthes peruviana (Desv.) MooreCheilanthes poeppigiana Mett. ex KuhnCheilanthes rufopunctata Rosenst.Cheilanthes sarmientoi PonceCheilanthes spiculata MickelCheilanthes squamosa Gill. ex Hook. & Grev.Cheilanthes volcanensis de la SotaCheilanthes sensu lato contains about 50 species that molecular phylogenetic studies suggest do not form a clade with the core Cheilanthes species, falling into separate clades, but for which no placement outside Cheilanthes was available :Cheilanthes adiantoides T.C.Chambers & P.A.FarrantCheilanthes angustifrondosa AlstonCheilanthes austrotenuifolia H.M.Quirk & T.C.ChambersCheilanthes bergiana Schltdl.Cheilanthes boivinii Mett. ex KuhnCheilanthes bolborrhiza Mickel & BeitelCheilanthes bonapartei J.P.RouxCheilanthes botswanae Schelpe & N.C.AnthonyCheilanthes brownii (Desv.) DominCheilanthes buchananii (Baker) DominCheilanthes capensis (Thunb.) Sw.Cheilanthes caudata R.Br.Cheilanthes ceterachoides A.W.Klopper & KlopperCheilanthes contracta KunzeCheilanthes deboeri Verdc.Cheilanthes deltoidea KunzeCheilanthes depauperata BakerCheilanthes dinteri BrauseCheilanthes distans (R.Br.) Mett.Cheilanthes dolomiticola (Schelpe) Schelpe & N.C.AnthonyCheilanthes eckloniana (Kunze) Mett.Cheilanthes erythraea Pic. Serm.Cheilanthes fragillima F.Muell.Cheilanthes hastata (L. fil.) KunzeCheilanthes hirta Sw.Cheilanthes inaequalis (Kunze) Mett.Cheilanthes induta KunzeCheilanthes involuta (Sw.) Schelpe & N.C.AnthonyCheilanthes kunzei Mett.Cheilanthes lasiophylla Pic. Serm.Cheilanthes leachii (Schelpe) SchelpeCheilanthes lozanoi (Maxon) R.M.Tryon & A.F.TryonCheilanthes madagascariensis BakerCheilanthes marlothii (Hieron.) SchelpeCheilanthes muelleri (Hook.) comb. ined.Cheilanthes multifida (Sw.) Sw.Cheilanthes namaquensis (Baker) Schelpe & N.C.AnthonyCheilanthes nielsii W.JacobsenCheilanthes nitida (R.Br.) P.S.GreenCheilanthes parviloba (Sw.) Sw.Cheilanthes pentagona Schelpe & N.C.AnthonyCheilanthes perlanata (Pic. Serm.) KornasCheilanthes perrieri J.P.RouxCheilanthes praetermissa D.L.JonesCheilanthes prenticei Luerss.Cheilanthes pumilio (R.Br.) F.Muell.Cheilanthes quadripinnata (Forsk.) KuhnCheilanthes reynoldsii (F.Muell.) comb. ined.Cheilanthes robusta (Kunze) TryonCheilanthes sieberi KunzeCheilanthes similis BallardCheilanthes skinneri'' (Hook.) R.M.Tryon & A.F.Tryon

References

Flora Europaea: Cheilanthes
Flora of North America: Cheilanthes
Cheilanthes glauca pictures from Chilebosque.
"lip fern." Encyclopædia Britannica Online. 30 Nov 2007.

 
Fern genera
Taxa named by Olof Swartz